VST is the first studio album by the Manila sound group VST & Company, released in 1978. The lead vocalist, Vic Sotto, was not credited and does not even appear in the group's picture at the back of the album, but was thanked in the album credits along with Tito Sotto and Joey de Leon.

Songs
The album contained five of their biggest hits including the ballads "Ikaw ang Aking Mahal" ("You Are My Love") and "Ipagpatawad" ("Please Forgive") as well as the disco numbers "Awitin Mo at Isasayaw Ko" ("You Sing, I'll Dance"), "Disco Fever" and "Magsayawan" ("Let's Dance").

Track listing

Personnel
According to the album's credits.
 Jun Medina - drums, vocals
 Spanky Rigor - bass guitar, vocals, executive producer
 Male Rigor - keyboards
 Celso Llarina - lead vocals
Val Sotto, rhythm guitar, vocals
 Roger Rigor - vocals 
 Mon Gaskell - keyboards, guitar, vocals
 Armando Trivino - arranger on "Disco Fever", "Ayos Ba" and "Habang Buhay Kitang Mamahalin"
 Lorrie Illustre - arranger on all songs 
Not credited
Vic Sotto - lead vocals

References

1978 debut albums
VST & Co. albums